Alden Albert Nowlan (January 25, 1933 – June 27, 1983) was a Canadian poet, novelist, and playwright.

History
Alden Nowlan was born into rural poverty in Stanley, Nova Scotia, adjacent to Mosherville, and close to the small town of Windsor, Nova Scotia, along a stretch of dirt road that he would later refer to as Desolation Creek. His father, Freeman Lawrence Nowlan, worked sporadically as a manual labourer.

His mother, Grace Reese, was only 14 years of age when Nowlan was born, and she soon left the family, leaving Alden and her younger daughter Harriet to the care of their paternal grandmother. The family discouraged education as a waste of time, and Nowlan left school after only four grades. At the age of 14, he went to work in the village sawmill. At the age of 16, he discovered the new library in Windsor. Often on weekends he would travel eighteen miles to the library to get books, which broadened his already keen reading.  "I wrote (as I read) in secret." Nowlan remembered. "My father would as soon have seen me wear lipstick."

Career and later life
At 19, Nowlan's artfully embroidered résumé landed him a job with Observer, a newspaper in Hartland, New Brunswick. While working at the Observer, Nowlan began writing books of poetry, the first of which was published by Fredericton's Fiddlehead Poetry Books.

Nowlan eventually settled permanently in New Brunswick. In 1963, he married Claudine Orser, a typesetter on his former paper, and moved to Saint John with her and her son, John, whom he adopted. He became the night editor for the Saint John Telegraph Journal and continued to write poetry. In 1966, Nowlan was diagnosed with throat cancer. After three surgeries and a subsequent radiation treatment, his health began to improve. He wrote poems about his brush with death. In 1967, he was awarded a Guggenheim Fellowship, and his collection Bread, Wine and Salt was awarded the Governor General's Award for Poetry. Soon afterward, the University of New Brunswick in Fredericton offered him the position of Writer-in-Residence. He remained in the position until his death on June 27, 1983, after collapsing at his home with severe emphysema.

Awards and recognition
Nowlan's most notable literary achievements include the Governor General's Award for Bread, Wine and Salt (1967) and a Guggenheim Fellowship. He was writer-in-residence at the University of New Brunswick in Fredericton from 1968 until his death in 1983. In New Brunswick, the Alden Nowlan Award for Excellence in English-language Literary Arts is named in his honour.

Nowlan is one of Canada's most popular 20th-century poets, and his appearance in the anthology Staying Alive (2002) has helped to spread his popularity beyond Canada.

In the 1970s, Nowlan met and became close friends with theatre director Walter Learning. The two collaborated on a number of plays, including A Gift to Last, Frankenstein, The Dollar Woman, and The Incredible Murder of Cardinal Tosca.

Nowlan's Fredericton home is now the residence of the Graduate Student Association at the University of New Brunswick. Dubbed "Windsor Castle" by Nowlan after its location on Windsor Street, the simple building is now officially called the Alden Nowlan House.

Nowlan is buried in the Poets' Corner of the Forest Hill cemetery in Fredericton, New Brunswick.

Bibliography

Poetry
A Darkness in the Earth. Eureka, California: Hearse, 1958.
The Rose and the Puritan. Fredericton, N.B.: University of New Brunswick, 1958.
Wind in a Rocky Country. Toronto: Emblem, 1960.
Under the Ice. Toronto: Ryerson, 1961.
Five New Brunswick Poets. Fredericton, N.B.: Fiddlehead Poetry Books, 1962. (with Elizabeth Brewster, Fred Cogswell, Robert Gibbs and Kay Smith)
The Things Which Are. Toronto: Contact, 1962.
Bread, Wine and Salt.  Toronto: Clarke, Irwin, 1967.
A Black Plastic Button and a Yellow Yoyo, handmade limited edition folio of 20 copies, printed and illustrated by Charles Pachter, Toronto 1968
The Mysterious Naked Man. Toronto: Clarke, Irwin, 1969.
Playing the Jesus Game: Selected Poems. Trumansburg, N.Y.: New/Books, 1970.
Between Tears and Laughter. Toronto: Clarke, Irwin, 1971.
I'm a Stranger Here Myself. Toronto: Clarke, Irwin, 1974.
Shaped by This Land. Fredericton: Brunswick, 1974.
Smoked Glass. Toronto: Clarke, Irwin, 1977.
I Might Not Tell Everybody This. Toronto: Clarke, Irwin, 1982.
Early Poems. Fredericton, N.B.: Fiddlehead Poetry Books, 1983.
An Exchange of Gifts: Poems New and Selected. Toronto: Irwin, 1985.
What Happened When He Went to the Store for Bread. Minneapolis: Nineties Press, 1993.
The Best of Alden Nowlan. Hantsport, N.S.: Lancelot, 1993.
Alden Nowlan: Selected Poems. Toronto: House of Anansi, 1996.
Between Tears and Laughter Tarset, Northumberland, U.K.: Bloodaxe, 2004. 
I, Icarus

Fiction
Miracle at Indian River. Clarke, Irwin, Toronto 1968
Various Persons Named Kevin O'Brien. Clarke, Irwin, Toronto 1973
 The year of the revolution, CBC radio anthology, Robert Weaver: Small wonders. New stories by 12 distinguished Canadian authors. CBC, Toronto 1982, pp 85 – 96
Will Ye Let the Mummers In. Irwin, Toronto 1984
The Wanton Troopers. Goose Lane, Fredericton 1988

Drama
Frankenstein: The Man Who Became God - Clarke, Irwin, Toronto 1973 (with Walter Learning)
The Dollar Woman – Playwrights Co-op, Toronto 1981 (with Walter Learning)
The Incredible Murder of Cardinal Tosca – Dramatic Publishing, 1978 (with Walter Learning)
A Gift to Last (with Walter Learning) from the teleplay by Gordon Pinsent
Gardens of the Wind – (CBC radio broadcast) Saskatoon: Thistledown, 1982.

Non-fiction
Campobello: The Outer Island. Toronto: Clarke, Irwin, 1975.
Double Exposure. Fredericton, N.B.: Brunswick Press, 1978.
Nine Micmac Legends. Hantsport, N.S.: Lancelot, 1983.
White Madness. Ottawa: Oberon, 1996.
Road Dancers. Ottawa: Oberon, 1999.

Anthologies
15 Canadian Poets X3, ed. Gary Geddes (Oxford University Press, 2001)
Coastlines: The Poetry of Atlantic Canada, ed. Anne Compton, Laurence Hutchman, Ross Leckie and Robin McGrath (Goose Lane Editions, 2002)

Recordings
Alden Nowlan's Maritimes. Canadian Broadcasting Corporation, 1972.

See also

Canadian literature
Canadian poetry
List of Canadian poets

References

 New, W. H., ed. The Encyclopedia of Literature in Canada. Toronto: University of Toronto Press, 2002. p. 835-837.
 Williamson, Margie. Four Maritime Poets: a survey of the works of Alden Nowlan, Fred Cogswell, Raymond Fraser and Al Pittman, as they reflect the spirit and culture of the Maritime people. Thesis (M.A.), Dalhousie University, 1973 [microform].

Further reading
 Raymond Fraser.  When The Earth Was Flat: Remembering Leonard Cohen, Alden Nowlan, the Flat Earth Society, the King James monarchy hoax, the Montreal Story Tellers and other curious matters. 2007 
 Patrick Toner. If I Could Turn and Meet Myself: The Life of Alden Nowlan Goose Lane Editions, 2000 
 Gregory M. Cook. One Heart, One Way: Alden Nowlan, A Writer's Life Pottersfield Press, 2003. 
 Alden Nowlan: Essays on His Works Guernica Editions, 2006

External links
 
 The Alden Nowlan Interviews
 "Alden Nowlan", The Canadian Encyclopedia entry by Douglas Fetherling
 Alden Nowlan and Social Class, by Thomas R. Smith, afterword to "My Family Was Poor"
 Nowlan at Athabasca University, with 5 hyperlinks > essays
Documentary on Nowlan
 The fall of a city by Alden Nowlan

1933 births
1983 deaths
20th-century Canadian dramatists and playwrights
Governor General's Award-winning poets
Writers from Fredericton
Writers from Nova Scotia
People from Hants County, Nova Scotia
Academic staff of the University of New Brunswick
Canadian male novelists
20th-century Canadian poets
Canadian male poets
20th-century Canadian novelists
Canadian male short story writers
Canadian male dramatists and playwrights
20th-century Canadian short story writers
20th-century Canadian male writers